Werner Schäfer (born 29 December 1952) is a German boxer. He competed in the men's bantamweight event at the 1972 Summer Olympics. At the 1972 Summer Olympics, he lost to Joe Destimo of Ghana.

References

External links
 

1952 births
Living people
German male boxers
Olympic boxers of West Germany
Boxers at the 1972 Summer Olympics
People from Ratingen
Sportspeople from Düsseldorf (region)
Bantamweight boxers